Peadar Maher (1 February 1924 – 31 January 2012) was an Irish Fianna Fáil politician who served as a Teachta Dála (TD) for the Laois–Offaly constituency.

A publican by profession, Maher was first elected to Dáil Éireann at the 1951 general election and held his seat until retiring at the 1961 general election.

He died in 2012.

References

1924 births
2012 deaths
Members of the 14th Dáil
Members of the 15th Dáil
Members of the 16th Dáil
Fianna Fáil TDs